Heroes & Villains is the second studio album by American record producer Metro Boomin, released on December 2, 2022, by Boominati and Republic Records. He primarily handled the album's production,  alongside TM88, Johan Lenox, DaHeala, Allen Ritter, Honorable C.N.O.T.E., and Oz, among others. Featured guest appearances include John Legend, Chris Brown, Future, Don Toliver, Travis Scott, 21 Savage, Young Nudy, Young Thug, the Weeknd, Mustafa, Takeoff, and Gunna. 

Heroes & Villains is the sequel to Metro Boomin's previous album, Not All Heroes Wear Capes (2018), and serves as the second album in a planned trilogy; ASAP Rocky and Morgan Freeman serve as the album's narrators. Recording sessions for the album took place between 2020 and 2022. Like its predecessor, Heroes & Villains was followed with a deluxe edition, subtitled the "Heroes Version" and released three days later, featuring the song instrumentals. A remixed edition, done by ChoppedNotSlopped titled the "Villains Version", was released on February 17, 2023, in collaboration with OG Ron C and DJ Candlestick.

Heroes & Villains debuted at the top of the US Billboard 200, with 185,000 album-equivalent units sold in its first week of release, making it Metro Boomin's third number one album. It was supported by the lead single "Creepin'" (with the Weeknd and 21 Savage), which reached number three on the US Billboard Hot 100; the remaining songs from the album all charted on the Billboard Hot 100, with "Superhero (Heroes & Villains)" (with Future and Chris Brown) reaching number eight.

Background and recording 
The album was first teased in November 2021 by Leyland Wayne's close friend and DJ Holiday.

Songs 
"Superhero (Heroes & Villains)", which an original version was leaked in May 2021, was first previewed in February 2021 by someone from Future's camp and consisted of two separate songs featuring Lil Double 0 while Future's verse were stems of an alternate version of Superhero. The song "Niagara Falls (Foot or 2)" was originally previewed on Travis Scott and his dj Chase B's .WAV Radio in October 2020 before the full song was leaked in January 2021 on Spotify but was ultimately taken down days after. Metro later revealed on Twitter that it would be the eleventh song with a remastered version than the previously leaked one. Drake had recorded a verse on "Trance" but was ultimately cut as Metro stated that the original version of the song sounded perfect as it was. The last song "All the Money" featuring Gunna appears as a bonus track that was originally on Gunna's third studio album DS4Ever but was removed for unknown reasons.

Promotion 
Metro slowly began revealing the album's features on a series of Instagram posts by showing comic book style covers of the artists. The album was accompanied by a short film that was released on November 30, 2022 starring Metro Boomin and Morgan Freeman.

Singles 
Metro Boomin announced the album in November 2022, and stated that it would have two sides: the "Hero" side and the "Villain" side. It was released on December 2. The lead single of the album, "Creepin'", a collaboration with Canadian singer the Weeknd and 21 Savage, was sent to rhythmic contemporary and contemporary hit radio on December 13.

Critical reception

Robin Murray of Clash wrote, "Indeed, one faultline on the record is that there is simply too much going on. 'HEROES & VILLAINS' bursts with ideas, not all of which land. A record that revels in contradictions, it grasps towards the light while framing itself in darkness." He also summarized, "A bold artist statement from Metro Boomin, 'HEROES & VILLAINS' progresses his arena-level sonic tapestry, while also leaving space to grow. A statement of intent, he utilises one of the finest contact books in American hip-hop to build his rogue's gallery." Writing for Mic Cheque, Hamza R. felt that "it means one must treat Heroes & Villains like a holistic experience, driven by its tight theme, and Metro's muted but irresistible sound that keeps the album's engine running" and "he remains a conductor, waving his wand to summon a trap album that may not be his personal best but is robust enough to upstage most albums of its kind this year". Brady Brickner-Wood of Pitchfork described the album as "an ambitious, detail-rich record that splits the difference between streaming fodder and world-building", adding that "proves that Metro aspires to more than hits". Charles Lyons-Burt of Slant Magazine summarized that the album is "not very ambitious as far as subject matter goes, but the majority of the guests, whose appearances never feel obligatory, at least cursorily touch on the central theme".

Commercial performance
Heroes & Villains debuted at number one on the US Billboard 200 with 185,000 album-equivalent units, making it Metro Boomin's third US number-one album.

Track listing

Notes
 signifies an additional producer
 signifies a co-producer
 "On Time" transitions into "Superhero (Heroes & Villains)"
 "Too Many Nights" transitions into "Raindrops (Insane)"
 "Raindrops (Insane)" transitions into "Umbrella"
 "Metro Spider" transitions into "I Can't Save You (Interlude)"
 "All the Money" was originally released on both the original and deluxe versions of Gunna's album DS4Ever (2022), being removed both times.

Sample credits
 "On Time" features an excerpt from the episode "The Only Man In the Sky" from the television series The Boys.
 "Superhero (Heroes & Villains)" contains samples from "So Appalled", written by Kanye West, Ernest Wilson, Mike Dean, Shawn Carter, Terrence Thornton, Cydell Young, Kaseem Dean, Robert Diggs, Manfred Mann, and performed by West. 
 "Creepin'" is a partial cover of "I Don't Wanna Know", written by Mario Winans, Eithne Ní Bhraonáin, Nicky Ryan, Roma Ryan, Chauncey Hawkins, Erick Sermon, and Parrish Smith, and performed by Winans, P. Diddy, and Enya.
 "Walk Em Down (Don't Kill Civillians)" contains an interpolation from the 2007 documentary Hood Affairs, starring Gucci Mane.
 "Feel the Fiyaaaah" contains samples from "Feel the Fire", written and performed by Peabo Bryson.

Personnel
Musicians
 Metro Boomin – programming
 ASAP Rocky – additional vocals (tracks 1,8, 9)
 Morgan Freeman – additional vocals (1, 7, 11)
 Johan Lenox – strings (1, 10), background vocals (1), keyboards (10)
 Marza Wilks – cello (1, 10)
 Kevin Lemons and Higher Calling – choir (1)
 Siraaj Rhett – horn (1)
 Peter Lee Johnson – strings (1, 10, 12), piano (5), violin (6), synthesizer (10), bass (12)
 Camille Miller – violin (1, 10)
 Yasmeen Al-Mazeedi – violin (1, 10)
 Delaram – background vocals (2)
 Mario Winans – background vocals (10)
 Travis Scott – background vocals (10)
 DaHeala – keyboards, programming (10)
 Simon Hessman – guitar (12)
 Thundercat – bass (14)

Technical
 Joe LaPorta – mastering
 Metro Boomin – mixing
 Ethan Stevens – mixing (all tracks), engineering (1, 2, 5–7, 9, 11–15)
 Patrizio "Teezio" Pigliapoco – engineering (2)
 Derek "206derek" Anderson – engineering (3, 4, 7, 9)
 Vern Emmanuel – engineering (5)
 Flo Ongonga – engineering (6, 15)
 Bainz – engineering (8)
 Kourosh Poursalehi – engineering (9)
 Isaiah "ibmixing" Brown – engineering (10)
 Shin Kamiyama – engineering (10)
 Eric Manco – engineering (13)
 Hector Delgado – engineering (14)
 Braden Davies – mixing assistance
 Zachary Acosta – mixing assistance
 Rebekka Zeyfiyan – engineering assistance (7, 9)
 Ryan Youngblood – engineering assistance (11)

Charts

Certifications

References

2022 albums
Metro Boomin albums
Republic Records albums
Albums produced by Allen Ritter
Albums produced by Honorable C.N.O.T.E.
Albums produced by Metro Boomin
Albums produced by TM88

Psychedelic music albums by American artists